Stamnodes deceptiva is a species of moth in the family Geometridae first described by William Barnes and James Halliday McDunnough in 1918. It is found in North America.

The MONA or Hodges number for Stamnodes deceptiva is 7355.

References

Further reading

 
 

Stamnodini
Articles created by Qbugbot
Moths described in 1918